General elections were held in Kenya on 27 December 2002. Voters elected the President, and members of the National Assembly. They coincided with the 2002 Kenyan local elections.

Mwai Kibaki of the National Rainbow Coalition (NARC) was elected, defeating Uhuru Kenyatta of the Kenya African National Union (KANU) and Simeon Nyachae of FORD–People.

Incumbent president Daniel arap Moi was ineligible to pursue a third term due to the two-term limit in the Constitution of Kenya. This was the first truly free general election held in Kenya since independence in 1964; a number of by-elections were held in 1966 before the onset of de facto one-party rule in 1969. The general election saw the end of the long-standing dominance of the KANU, which had governed the country since independence in 1963, including 23 years as the only legal party. The National Rainbow Coalition won a majority in the National Assembly.

Background
Incumbent president Moi was constitutionally barred from running in the 2002 presidential elections. Some of his supporters floated the idea of amending the constitution to allow him to run for a third term, but Moi preferred to retire, choosing Uhuru Kenyatta, the son of Kenya's first President, as his successor. In protest of Moi's decision a group of disappointed KANU presidential aspirants quit KANU and formed the Liberal Democratic Party (LDP). 

In preparation for the 2002 elections, Kibaki's Democratic Party affiliated with several other opposition parties, including the LDP and National Alliance Party of Kenya (NAK) to form the National Rainbow Coalition (NARC). On 14 October 2002, at a large opposition rally in Uhuru Park in Nairobi, Kibaki was nominated as the NARC candidate after Raila Odinga declared Kibaki Tosha!

Results

President

National Assembly

Of the 12 appointed seats, seven were members of the National Rainbow Coalition, four were members of KANU and one was a member of FORD–People.

See also
9th Parliament of Kenya

References

Kenya
Elections in Kenya
2002 in Kenya
National Assembly (Kenya)
Presidential elections in Kenya
Election and referendum articles with incomplete results